None Shall Pass is the fifth studio album by American hip hop artist Aesop Rock. It was released on Definitive Jux on August 28, 2007.

Music 
The album features production by Blockhead, El-P, Rob Sonic, and Aesop Rock himself. Guest appearances include DJ Big Wiz, Cage, Breeze Brewin, El-P, Rob Sonic, and John Darnielle of The Mountain Goats. The album's artwork was done by Jeremy Fish.

Release 
Following its release, None Shall Pass debuted at number 50 on the U.S. Billboard 200 chart, selling about 13,000 copies in its first week through independent hip hop label Definitive Jux.

Track listing

Notes
  signifies an additional producer
  Blockhead is credited for producing "Coffee", but Aesop Rock produced the hidden track "Pigs", which starts at 5:15.

Personnel
Contributing artists
Allyson Baker – guitar (tracks 1, 3, 8, 12 and 14)
Carson Binks – bass guitar (tracks 3 and 8)
Derek Layes – bass guitar (track 4)
Big Hollis – additional vocals (track 1)
Camu Tao – additional vocals (track 1)
Rob Sonic – additional vocals (tracks 1 and 8)
El-P – additional vocals (track 7)
DJ Big Wiz – scratching (all tracks except 10)

Production
Ken Heitmueller – mastering
Joey Raia – mixing
Jeremy Fish – artwork, layout, design

Charts

References

External links
 

2007 albums
Aesop Rock albums
Definitive Jux albums
Albums produced by Aesop Rock
Albums produced by Blockhead (music producer)
Albums produced by El-P